Maxwell James Grant Smart (1896–1972) was a notable New Zealand farmer, museum director, historian, archaeologist and writer. He was born in Wanganui, New Zealand in 1896.

References

1896 births
1972 deaths
New Zealand farmers
New Zealand archaeologists
20th-century New Zealand historians
New Zealand curators
People from Whanganui
20th-century archaeologists